L'iguana dalla lingua di fuoco is a 1971 giallo film. It is directed by Riccardo Freda, who was unhappy with the film and had his name replaced with the pseudonym "Willy Pareto".

Cast 
 Luigi Pistilli as Detective John Norton
 Dagmar Lassander as Helen Sobiesky 
 Anton Diffring as  Ambassador Sobieski
 Arthur O'Sullivan as  Insp. Lawrence 
 Werner Pochath as  Marc Sobiesky 
 Dominique Boschero as  Ambassador's mistress
 Valentina Cortese as  Mrs. Sobiesky

Production 
Prior to the release of Dario Argento's film The Bird with the Crystal Plumage, giallo films were not popular among Italian film audiences. Following the release of Bird, a wave of giallos were released with animal's names in their title. This led Riccardo Freda to follow suit and attempt a film in the genre.

The film's opening credits state it is based on the novel A Room Without a Door, by Richard Mann. Italian film historian Roberto Curti said that the novel was an invention of the filmmakers. The screenplay of the film was written by Sandro Continenza and Freda, while other credited writers André Tranché and Gunther Ebert were credited solely for co-production reasons.

Riccardo Freda was not proud of the film and was unhappy with the cast. He later said that he had initially wanted "Roger Moore in the lead, but at the last minute I got Luigi Pistilli."

L'iguana dalla lingua di fuoco was filmed in Ireland.

Release 
L'iguana dalla lingua di fuoco was distributed theatrically in Italy by Euro International Films on 24 August 1971. It grossed a total of 169,405,000 Italian lire domestically. Curti described this box office performance as "rather poor", noting that other films in the genre from that year such as The Cat o' Nine Tails grossed 2.4 billion while The Night Evelyn Came Out of the Grave grossed 450 million.

A photonovel version of the film was released in the adults-only magazine Cinesex in January 1972.

The film was released on Blu-Ray in 2019, as The Iguana With the Tongue of Fire, in both an Italian and English dubbed version.

Critical reception 
From retrospective reviews, AllMovie wrote, "Stylish director Riccardo Freda gave Italy some of its greatest horror films. This gory but preposterous giallo thriller is not one of them", calling it "one of a great director's most blatant misfires." Louis Paul, author of Italian Horror Film Directors described the film as a "nasty and vicious entry in the giallo thriller genre, complete with the hindrance of an unlikable cast of villains and suspects."

References

Footnotes

Sources

External links 
 
 The Iguana with the Tongue of Fire at Variety Distribution

1971 films
Giallo films
Films directed by Riccardo Freda
Films scored by Stelvio Cipriani
Iguana dalla lingua di fuoco
French serial killer films
West German films
Films shot in Ireland
1970s crime thriller films
Crime horror films
1971 horror films
1970s slasher films
Italian serial killer films
1970s Italian films